Avanza Bank Holding AB is the largest stockbroker and brokerage firm in Sweden and on the Stockholm Stock Exchange, with over a million customers.

History 

Avanza was founded in 1999 as HQ.se.

In 2001, HQ.se acquired Avanza changed its name to Avanza, which became the largest stockbroker in Sweden, with 80,000 active customers.

In 2006, Avanza acquired Börsveckan AB and launched Placera Nu, an online magazine.

In 2018, the company launched the cheapest global fund in the world, with an annual management fee of 0.05%.

In 2019, Avanza won the Swedish Quality Index’s award for the most satisfied savings customers in Sweden for the tenth consecutive year.

References

External links
Börsveckan
Placera Nu

Brokerage firms
Financial services companies of Sweden
Online brokerages
Companies based in Stockholm
Swedish companies established in 1999
Financial services companies established in 1999
Companies listed on Nasdaq Stockholm